The 2010 Palmer Cup was held on 24–26 June 2010 at the Royal Portrush Golf Club in Portrush, County Antrim, Northern Ireland. The United States won 13–11.

Format
The format was revised with play being over three days rather than two. On Thursday, there were four matches of four-ball in the morning, followed by four foursomes matches in the afternoon. Eight singles matches were played on Friday, and eight more on Saturday. In all, 24 matches were played.

Each of the 24 matches was worth one point in the larger team competition. If a match was all square after the 18th hole, each side earned half a point toward their team total. The team that accumulated at least 12½ points won the competition.

Teams
Eight college golfers from Europe and the United States participated in the event.

Thursday's matches

Morning four-ball

Afternoon foursomes

Friday's singles matches

Saturday's singles matches

Michael Carter award
The Michael Carter Award winners were Henrik Norlander and Daniel Miernicki.

References

External links
Palmer Cup official site

Arnold Palmer Cup
Golf tournaments in Northern Ireland
Sport in County Antrim
Palmer Cup
Palmer Cup
Palmer Cup